GE Energy Financial Services (EFS), a division of GE Capital headquartered in Stamford, Connecticut, United States, provides financial and technological investment in energy infrastructure projects around the world. EFS is active within industries such as power generation and distribution, oil and gas, pipelines and storage, water, venture capital, and renewable energy.  EFS portfolios include deepwater oil and gas exploration in Brazil and water pipeline projects in Jordan.

GE EFS has invested billions of dollars in the solar industry.

Partial list of projects

 Dokie Ridge Wind Farm, near Chetwynd, British Columbia, Canada
 Toba Inlet run-of-the river project in Toba Inlet, British Columbia, Canada (joint venture through Toba Montrose General Partnership)

References

General Electric Commercial Finance subsidiaries
Companies based in Stamford, Connecticut